Cormopsocidae is an extinct family of Psocodea. All currently known members are from the mid-Cretaceous Burmese amber of Myanmar. The family is considered either to be the earliest diverging group of the suborder Trogiomorpha, or the sister group to all other psocids, and retains many primitive characteristics.

Taxonomy 

 Cormopsocus Yoshizawa & Lienhard, 2020
 Cormopsocus groehni Yoshizawa & Lienhard, 2020
 Cormopsocus neli Hakim et al., 2021
 Cormopsocus perantiqua (Cockerell, 1919).
 Stimulopsocus Liang and Liu, 2021
 Stimulopsocus jiewenae Liang and Liu, 2021
 Longiglabellus Wang, Li & Yao, 2021
 Longiglabellus edentatus Wang, Li & Yao 2021
 Longiglabellus pedhyalinus Wang, Li & Yao, 2021

References 

Trogiomorpha
Prehistoric insect families